The Producers Guild Film Awards for Best Music Director (previously known as the Apsara Award for Best Music Director) is given by the producers of the film and television guild as part of its annual award ceremony to recognise the best Indian film of the year. Following its inception in 2004, no one was awarded in 2005 and 2007.

Superlatives

Winner and nominees

2000s
 2004 Shankar–Ehsaan–Loy - Kal Ho Naa Ho
 Rajesh Roshan - Koi... Mil Gaya
 Jatin–Lalit and Aadesh Shrivastava - Chalte Chalte
 Uttam Singh - Pinjar
 Himesh Reshammiya - Tere Naam
 2005 - no award
 2006 Shankar–Ehsaan–Loy - Bunty Aur Babli
Shantanu Moitra - Parineeta
Anu Malik - Murder
Late Madan Mohan - Veer-Zaara
Himesh Reshammiya - Aashiq Banaya Apne
 2007 - no award
 2008 Pritam - Jab We Met
A.R. Rahman - guru
Vishal–Shekhar - Om Shanti Om
Pritam - Life in a ... Metro
Monty Sharma - Saawariya
 2009 A.R. Rahman - Jodhaa Akbar
Shankar–Ehsaan–Loy - Taare Zameen Par
Shankar–Ehsaan–Loy Rock On!!
A.R. Rahman Jaane Tu Ya Jaane Na
Pritam - Singh Is Kinng

2010s
 2010 Pritam - Love Aaj Kal
 A.R.Rahman - Ghajini
Salim–Sulaiman - Rab Ne Bana Di Jodi
Pritam - Ajab Prem Ki Ghazab Kahani
A.R. Rahman - Delhi-6
 2011 Sajid–Wajid - Dabangg
Vishal–Shekhar - I Hate Luv Storys
Pritam - Once Upon a Time in Mumbai
Pritam - Crook
Vishal Bhardwaj - Ishqiya
Shankar–Ehsaan–Loy - My Name Is Khan
 2012 A.R. Rehman - Rockstar
Himesh Reshammiya & Pritam - Bodyguard
Pritam - Dum Maaro Dum
Sachin-Jigar - F.A.L.T.U
Sohail Sen - Mere Brother Ki Dulhan
Pritam - Ready
 2013 Pritam - Cocktail
A.R. Rahman - Jab Tak Hai Jaan
Ajay–Atul - Agneepath
Pritam - Barfi!
Sneha Khanwalkar - Gangs of Wasseypur
 2014 Pritam - Yeh Jawaani Hai Deewani
A.R. Rahman - Raanjhanaa
Sanjay Leela Bhansali - Goliyon Ki Raasleela Ram-Leela
Vishal–Shekhar - Chennai Express
Shankar–Ehsaan–Loy - Bhaag Milkha Bhaag
Mithoon - Tum Hi Ho
 2015 Ankit Tiwari - Galliyan - Ek Villain
Amit Trivedi - London Thumakda - Queen
Himesh Reshammiya - Jumme Ki Raat - Kick
Yo Yo Honey Singh - Sunny Sunny - Yaariyan
Vishal Bhardwaj - Bismil - Haider
Meet Bros Anjjan - Baby Doll - Ragini MMS 2
A.R Rahman- Patakha Guddi - Highway
 2016 Amaal Mallik, Ankit Tiwari, Meet Bros Anjjan - Roy
Jeet Ganguly and Mithoon - Hamari Adhuri Kahani
Anu Malik - Dum Laga Ke Haisha
Pritam - Bajrangi Bhaijaan
A.R Rahman - Tamasha
Krsna Solo - Tanu Weds Manu Returns

References

Producers Guild Film Awards